Geomitra delphinuloides is an extinct species of air-breathing land snails, terrestrial pulmonate gastropod mollusks in the family Geomitridae.

Geomitra delphinuloides was listed as critically endangered in the 1996 IUCN Red List, but it is considered to be extinct.

Distribution 
This species was endemic to Madeira, Portugal.

References

Extinct gastropods
Geomitra
Taxa named by Richard Thomas Lowe
Gastropods described in 1860
Taxonomy articles created by Polbot
Taxobox binomials not recognized by IUCN